WTAX (1240 kHz) is a commercial AM radio station in Springfield, Illinois. It is owned by Saga Communications and it simulcasts a News/Talk radio format with 93.9 WTAX-FM.  The radio studios and offices are on East Sangamon Avenue in Springfield.

WTAX broadcasts at 1,000 watts, using a non-directional antenna.  The transmitter is on South Dirksen Highway in Springfield.

Programming
Weekdays on WTAX-AM-FM begin with a local drive time show, "The Morning Newswatch," hosted by Joey McLaughlin.  The rest of the weekday schedule is made up of nationally syndicated talk shows:  Hugh Hewitt, "Markley, Van Camp and Robbins," Sean Hannity, Mark Levin, John Batchelor, "Red Eye Radio" and "This Morning, America's First News with Gordon Deal."

Weekends feature shows on money, health, home repair, technology, the law and cars.  Weekend hosts include Joe Pags, Sebastian Gorka, Chris Plante, Leo Laporte and Bill Handel.  Most hours begin with world and national news from CBS Radio News.

History

WTAX's first license was granted on October 11, 1923, to the Williams Hardware Company in Streator, Illinois. The call letters were randomly assigned by the government from a sequential list of available call signs. It was initially on 1300 kHz, with a power of 20 watts. In mid-1927 the station was reassigned to 930 kHz. On November 11, 1928, with the implementation of the Federal Radio Commission's General Order 40, it was moved to 1210 kHz.

WTAX relocated to Springfield in late 1930. On March 29, 1941 most stations on 1210 kHz, including WTAX, moved to 1240 kHz, under the provisions of the North American Regional Broadcasting Agreement.

In 1948, WTAX added an FM station, broadcasting at 103.7 MHz, WTAX-FM.  That station is now WDBR.  Recently, co-owned 93.9 FM has taken the WTAX-FM call letters to simulcast the news/talk programming on 1240 AM.

Programming was previously also broadcast on 107.5 FM, over translator station W298AP, which once served as a second signal for sister adult hits station WABZ. The W298AP simulcast lasted until January 31, 2017, when W298AP switched to oldies, now simulcasting WDBR's HD3 subchannel.

Previous logos
 (WTAX's logo under previous simulcast with 107.5 FM translator)  (WTAX's logo under previous simulcast with 93.5 FM translator)

References

External links

FCC History Catds for WTAX (covering 1923-1980)

TAX
News and talk radio stations in the United States
Radio stations established in 1923
1923 establishments in Illinois